There are a number of planetary objects proposed in religion, astrology, ufology and pseudoscience whose existence is not supported by scientific evidence.

Lilith

Lilith is a fictitious second moon of Earth, supposedly about the same mass as the Earth's Moon, proposed in 1918 by astrologer Walter Gorn Old, who called himself Sepharial. Sepharial applied the name Lilith from medieval Jewish legend, where she is described as the first wife of Adam.
Sepharial claimed that Lilith was the same second moon that scientist Georg Waltemath claimed to have discovered twenty years earlier, but which had never been confirmed. Sepharial also claimed to be the first person in history to observe Waltemath's moon as it crossed the sun, and rationalized that it was too dark to be otherwise visually detected.

Sepharial's comments ignored the fact that Waltemath's proposed moon had already been discredited by the scientific community at the turn of the century.

There are many readily apparent holes in the arguments supporting Lilith's existence, and its existence is believed only by fringe groups.

In modern astrology

In present-day astrology, the name Black Moon Lilith is usually given to a point on the horoscope of the actual moon's apogee. When considered as a point, this Lilith is sometimes defined as the second focus of the ellipse described by the Moon's orbit; the earth is the first focus, and the apogee lies in the same direction. It takes 8 years and 10 months to complete its circuit around the zodiac.

Planets proposed by L. Ron Hubbard
L. Ron Hubbard, the founder of Scientology, proposed as part of his cosmology a Galactic Confederacy which consisted of 26 stars and 76 planets including Earth, which was then known as "Teegeeack".
One planet in the Scientology doctrine is known as Helatrobus.

Ummo

Ummo or Ummoism is a decades-long series of claims that aliens from the planet Ummo were communicating with people on the Earth. Most Ummo information was in the form of detailed documents and letters sent to various esoteric groups or UFO enthusiasts. The Ummo affair was subject to much mainstream attention in France and Spain during the 1960s through the 1970s, and a degree of interest remains regarding the subject. Consensus is that Ummoism was an elaborate hoax. The culprit (or culprits) is unknown, but a José Luis Jordán Peña has claimed responsibility for instigating Ummoism. However, there are still a few small groups of devotees, such as "a strange Bolivian cult called the Daughters of Ummo".

Jacques Vallée has said that the author(s) of the Ummo documents might be a real-world analogue of the fictional creators of Borges' "Tlön, Uqbar, Orbis Tertius". Historian Mike Dash writes that Ummoism began on February 6, 1966, in Madrid. On that day, Jordán Peña claimed to have had a close encounter of the first kind when he saw "an enormous circular object with three legs and, on its underside, a curious symbol: three vertical lines joined by a horizontal bar. The two exterior lines curved outward at the edges, which made the pictogram resemble the alchemical sign for the planet Uranus." (Dash, 299)

Peña's report generated a fair amount of excitement, but it was only the beginning. Not long afterwards, a Madrid author of a UFO book received several photographs in an anonymous mailing. The photos were of a craft similar to the one reported by Peña, and bearing the same symbol. Within a few weeks, "a leading Spanish contactee named Fernando Sesma Manzano became involved when he began receiving lengthy, typewritten documents which purported to come from a spacefaring race called the Ummites." (Dash, 299) 

In June 2002, a scientist with the pseudonym Jean Pollion released, in French, his book , or, Ummo, real extraterrestrials in which he analyses the "Ummite" thoughts and language. He shows that the Ummo language is different from any other language we know in that it is a "functional" language. One of the astonishing properties of this language, according to the author, is that it works without a dictionary. One must only know 18 symbols, that Pollion has named "soncepts", which if combined make up a functional description of the thing or situation that the creator of the "word" is trying to convey. Currently, more than 1300 pages of those letters have been registered, but it is possible that many other letters exist. In a 1988 letter, reference is made to the existence of 3850 pages, copies of which have been sent to several individuals, representing perhaps up to 160,000 pages of total Ummo documents. The true identity of the authors of those reports remains unknown.

Dash notes that "few ufologists outside Spain took Ummoism seriously—the photographic evidence was highly suspect, and, while the Ummite letters were more sophisticated than most contactee communication, there was nothing in them that could not have originated on Earth." Still, Dash allows that, whatever their origins, "considerable effort had gone into the supposed hoax." (Dash, 299)

Many scientific subjects are described in detail in the letters, including network theory (or graph theory), astrophysics, cosmology, the unified field theory, biology, and evolution. Some of this information is thought to be dubious pseudoscience, but much of it is scientifically accurate. However, Jerome Clark (Clark, 1993) notes that Jacques Vallée argued that the scientific content of the Ummo letters was knowledgeable but unremarkable, and compared the scientific references to a well-researched science fiction novel—plausible in the 1960s, but dated by the standards of the 1990s. Controversy arose about one particular assertion of the Ummites. In 1965, they wrote they were coming from a planet orbiting Wolf 424, adding this star is 3.68502 light-years of the Sun. This was consistent with the distance estimated in 1938, but after some additional measurements, the estimate was revised to 14.3 light-years. Fernando Sesma asked then the Ummites about this apparent mistake. The Ummites replied in another letter the same year that the first measurement is the real distance measured in the "three-dimensional framework" while the second is "the apparent distance traveled by light".

Planets proposed by Zecharia Sitchin

The work of Zecharia Sitchin has garnered much attention among ufologists, ancient astronaut theorists and conspiracy theorists. He claimed to have uncovered, through his retranslations of Sumerian texts, evidence that the human race was visited/created by a group of extraterrestrials from a distant planet in the Solar System. Part of his theory lay in an astronomical interpretation of the Babylonian creation myth, the Enuma Elish, in which he replaced the names of gods with hypothetical planets. However, since the principal evidence for Sitchin's claims lay in his own personally derived etymologies and not on any scholarly agreed interpretations, academics consider it pseudoscience and pseudohistory, if they know it at all.

Sitchin's theory proposes the planets Tiamat and Nibiru. Tiamat supposedly existed between Mars and Jupiter. The planet's orbit was disrupted by the arrival of a large planet or very small star (less than twenty times the size of Jupiter) which passed through the planetary system between 65 million and four billion years ago. The new orbits caused Tiamat to collide with one of the moons of Nibiru. The debris from this collision are thought by the theory's proponents to have variously formed the asteroid belt and the current form of planet Earth.

Sitchin claims that the Babylonians associated Nibiru with the god Marduk; the word is Akkadian and the meaning is uncertain. Sitchin hypothesized it as a planet in a highly elliptic orbit around the Sun, with a perihelion passage some 3,600 years ago and assumed orbital period of about 3,450 years; he also claimed it was the home of a technologically advanced human-like alien race, the Anunnaki, who apparently visited Earth in search of gold. These beings eventually created humanity by genetically crossing themselves with extant primates, and thus became the first gods.

Beginning in 1995, websites such as ZetaTalk have claimed that Nibiru or "Planet X" is a brown dwarf currently within our planetary system, soon to pass relatively close to Earth. Sitchin disagreed it is a star, with the timing and parameters of passage.

Sitchin also postulated that Pluto began life as Gaga, a satellite of Saturn which, due to perturbation caused by Nibiru's passing, was flung into orbit beyond Neptune.

Serpo

Project Serpo is an alleged top-secret exchange program between the United States government and an alien planet called Serpo in the Zeta Reticuli star system. Details of the alleged exchange program have appeared in several UFO conspiracy stories, including one incident in 1983—in which a man identifying himself as United States Air Force Sergeant Richard C. Doty contacted investigative journalist Linda Moulton Howe claiming to be able to supply her Air Force records of the exchange for her HBO documentary The ET Factor, only to pull out without providing any evidence to substantiate his story—and one incident in 2005 when a series of emails were sent to a UFO discussion group run by Victor Martinez claiming that the project was real. Some variations on the conspiracy story state that the name Serpo is the nickname of the extrasolar planet. Other versions state that it is a mispronunciation of either Serponia or Seinu by authorities involved in the project.

The first mention of a 'Project Serpo' was in a UFO email list maintained by enthusiast Victor Martinez. Various versions of the conspiracy theory circulated and were later detailed on a website. According to the most common version of the story, an alien survived a crash near Roswell in the later 1940s (see Roswell UFO incident). This alien was detained but treated well by American military forces, contacted its home planet and eventually repatriated. The story continues by claiming that this led to the establishment of some sort of relationship between the American government and the people of its home world, said to be a planet of the binary star system Zeta Reticuli.

Zeta Reticuli has a history in ufology (including the Betty and Barney Hill abduction and the Bob Lazar story), having been claimed as the home system of an alien race called the Greys.

The story finally claims that twelve American military personnel visited the planet between 1965 and 1978 and that all of the party have since died, from "after effects of high radiation levels from the two suns". Another version of the story claims that "Eight (8) Team Members returned on the seven (7) month trek home. Team Member #308 (Team Pilot #2) died of a pulmonary embolism en route to SERPO on the 9-month journey; 11 arrived safely. One (1) died on the planet – and both of their bodies were returned to Earth – while two (2) others decided to remain on the ALIEN homeworld of SERPO." (http://www.serpo.org/release36.php) 
One criticism of Project Serpo stems from the lack of veracity of one of its alleged witnesses, Sergeant Richard Doty. Doty has been involved in other alleged UFO-related activities (see Majestic 12 and Paul Bennewitz), and thus is a discredited source (or a purposeful provider of disinformation). Additionally, there is no physical evidence supporting the project's existence. According to Tim Swartz of Mysteries Magazine, Doty, who promised evidence to Moulton Howe before backing out, has been involved in circulating several other UFO conspiracy stories. Swartz also expressed that the details of Project Serpo have varied considerably with different accounts. It has been alleged that the entire series of posts were designed to be viral marketing for a new book by Doty.

Bill Ryan, a chief proponent of publicizing the Project Serpo claims, announced on March 5, 2007, that he was stepping down from his role as webmaster for the Serpo material. Ryan nevertheless maintains his belief that an extraterrestrial exchange program did occur, although he states that the Serpo releases definitely contained disinformation.

See also

 Fictional planets of the Solar System
 Kolob
 Lost asteroids
 Nibiru cataclysm
 Planets in astrology
 Religious cosmology
 Stars proposed in religion
 UFO conspiracy theory

Notes

References
 Clark, Jerome, Unexplained! 347 Strange Sightings, Incredible Occurrences, and Puzzling Physical Phenomena; Detroit, Visible Ink Press; 1993, 
 Mike Dash, Borderlands: The Ultimate Exploration of the Unknown, 

 
Hypothetical bodies of the Solar System
Astrology-related lists